Bezirk Graz-Umgebung is a district of the state of Styria in Austria. Since the 2015 Styria municipal structural reform, it consists of the following municipalities:

 Deutschfeistritz
 Dobl-Zwaring
 Eggersdorf bei Graz
 Feldkirchen bei Graz
 Fernitz-Mellach
 Frohnleiten
 Gössendorf
 Gratkorn
 Gratwein-Straßengel
 Hart bei Graz
 Haselsdorf-Tobelbad
 Hausmannstätten
 Hitzendorf
 Kainbach bei Graz
 Kalsdorf bei Graz
 Kumberg
 Laßnitzhöhe
 Lieboch
 Nestelbach bei Graz
 Peggau
 Premstätten
 Raaba-Grambach
 Sankt Bartholomä
 Sankt Marein bei Graz
 Sankt Oswald bei Plankenwarth
 Sankt Radegund bei Graz
 Seiersberg-Pirka
 Semriach
 Stattegg
 Stiwoll
 Thal
 Übelbach
 Vasoldsberg
 Weinitzen
 Werndorf
 Wundschuh

Municipalities before 2015
Towns (Städte) are indicated in boldface; market towns (Marktgemeinden) in italics; suburbs, hamlets and other subdivisions of a municipality are indicated in small characters.
 Attendorf
Attendorfberg, Mantscha, Schadendorfberg, Södingberg, Stein
 Brodingberg
Brodersdorf, Haselbach, Affenberg
Deutschfeistritz
Zitoll, Kleinstübing, Prenning, Waldstein
 Dobl
Muttendorf, Petzendorf, Weinzettl
 Edelsgrub
 Eggersdorf bei Graz
Edelsbach bei Graz
 Eisbach
Hörgas, Kehr und Plesch, Rein
 Feldkirchen bei Graz 
Abtissendorf, Lebern, Wagnitz
 Fernitz
Gnaning
 Frohnleiten
Adriach, Badl, Brunnhof, Gams, Gamsgraben, Hofamt, Laas, Laufnitzdorf, Laufnitzgraben, Leutnant Günther-Siedlung, Maria Ebenort, Peugen, Pfannberg, Rothleiten, Schönau, Schrauding, Schweizerfabrik, Ungersdorf, Wannersdorf
 Gössendorf
Dörfla, Thondorf, Grambach
 Gratkorn
Forstviertel, Freßnitzviertel, Kirchenviertel, Sankt Veit, Unterfriesach
 Gratwein
 Großstübing
 Gschnaidt
 Hart bei Graz
Hart bei St. Peter, Messendorf
 Hart-Purgstall
Hart bei Eggersdorf
 Haselsdorf-Tobelbad
Badegg, Haselsdorf, Haselsdorfberg, Tobelbad
 Hausmannstätten
Berndorf
 Hitzendorf
Altenberg, Altreiteregg, Berndorf, Doblegg, Höllberg, Holzberg, Mayersdorf, Michlbach, Neureiteregg, Niederberg, Oberberg, Pirka
 Höf-Präbach
Höf, Präbach
 Judendorf-Straßengel
Hundsdorf, Judendorf, Kugelberg, Rötz, Straßengel
 Kainbach bei Graz
Hönigtal, Kainbach, Schaftal
 Kalsdorf bei Graz
Forst, Großsulz, Kleinsulz, Thalerhof
 Krumegg
Kohldorf
 Kumberg
Kumberg, Gschwendt, Hofstätten, Rabnitz
 Langegg bei Graz
Hirtenfeld, Kogelbuch, Lambach, Langegg-Ort, Mittergoggitsch, Obergoggitsch, Unterbuch, Zaunstein
 Laßnitzhöhe
 Lieboch
Schadendorf, Spatenhof
 Mellach
Dillach, Enzelsdorf
 Nestelbach bei Graz
Mitterlaßnitz
 Peggau
Friesach
 Pirka
Windorf
 Raaba
Dürwagersbach
 Röthelstein
 Rohrbach-Steinberg
Rohrbach, Steinberg
 Sankt Bartholomä
Jaritzberg, Lichtenegg, Reiteregg
 Sankt Marein bei Graz
Sankt Marein bei Graz-Markt, Sankt Marein bei Graz-Umgebung
 Sankt Oswald bei Plankenwarth
Plankenwarth
 Sankt Radegund bei Graz
Willersdorf, Kickenheim, Diepoltsberg, Ebersdorf, Rinnegg, Schöckl
 Schrems bei Frohnleiten
Gschwendt, Schrems
 Seiersberg
Gedersberg, Neuseiersberg
 Semriach
Markterviertl, Präbichl, Rechberg, Schönegg, Thoneben, Windhof
 Stattegg
Buch, Eichberg, Hochgreit, Hohenberg, Hub, Kalkleiten, Krail, Leber, Mühl, Neudorf, Rannach, Steingraben, Ursprung
 Stiwoll
 Thal bei Graz
 Tulwitz
Tulwitzdorf, Tulwitzviertl
 Tyrnau
Nechnitz
 Übelbach
Kleintal, Land-Übelbach, Markt-Übelbach, Neuhof
 Unterpremstätten
Hautzendorf, Oberpremstätten
 Vasoldsberg
Breitenhilm, Ferbesdorf, Schelchenberg, Schelchental, Premstätten bei Vasoldsberg, Birkengreith, Birkendorf, Steinberg, Wiesental, Kühlenbrunn, Wagersbach, Wagersfeld, Aschenbachberg, Aschenbachtal
 Weinitzen
Fölling, Niederschöckl, Oberschöckl
 Werndorf
 Wundschuh
Forst, Gradenfeld, Kasten, Ponigl
 Zettling
Bierbaum, Laa 
 Zwaring-Pöls
Dietersdorf, Fading, Lamberg, Pöls an der Wieserbahn, Steindorf, Wuschan, Zwaring

References

 
Districts of Styria